Like an Ever Flowing Stream is the debut album by Swedish death metal band Dismember, released in May 1991.

Overview
The title may refer to the Biblical Book of Amos 5:24, "Let justice roll down like waters, and righteousness like an ever-flowing stream" (New International Version). A music video was made for the track "Soon to Be Dead". Since Karmageddon Records owns the rights to the album, it was not re-issued as a digipack disc in 2005 like every other album (except for Where Ironcrosses Grow). Regain re-issued those digipack versions and also remastered the albums while Karmageddon released an exact copy of the 1996 issue by Nuclear Blast (except for two additional bonus tracks).

Nicke Andersson, at the time the drummer in Entombed played all the lead guitars except for the guitar solo on "Override of the Overture", which is played by David Blomqvist.

Reception

Modern reviews for Like an Ever Flowing Stream have been positive. AllMusic's Phil Freeman gave the album a rating of five stars and called it "one of the crucial documents of the early-'90s Swedish death metal scene." Adam McCann of Metal Digest noted that, "Alongside Entombed, Grave and Unleashed, this debut album didn't just help place Swedish death metal on the map, it took the flag and slammed it through a lifeless corpse, unveiling the blue and yellow. For many fans of Dismember, Like an Ever Flowing Stream is often regarded as not just their favourite Dismember album, but also one of the best death metal albums of all time."

In 2010, the album was inducted into Decibel magazine's Hall of Fame.

Track listing

Personnel
Dismember
Matti Kärki  –  Vocals
Robert Senneback –  Guitar
David Blomqvist  –  Guitar, Lead Guitar on Track 1
Richard Diamon – Bass
Fred Estby  –  Drums

Additional musician
Nicke Andersson  –  Lead Guitar on All Tracks Except Track 1 and Dismember logo design

Production
Produced & Mixed By Tomas Skogsberg & Fred Estby
Recorded & Engineered By Tomas Skogsberg
Dan Seagrave  –  Design, Cover Design
Gottfrid Jarnefors  –  Photography

References

Dismember (band) albums
1991 debut albums
Albums with cover art by Dan Seagrave
Nuclear Blast albums